BGL, or bgl, may refer to:

 Baby Girl Lisa from 90 Day Fiancé: Before the 90 Days, season four
 BGL, the former code for the Bulgarian lev
 BGL, the IATA code for Baglung Airport, Gandaki Province, Nepal
 bgl, the ISO 639-3 code for the Maleng language of Laos and Vietnam
 BGL, the license plate code for Landkreis Berchtesgadener Land, Bavaria, Germany
 BGL, the National Rail code for Bugle railway station, Cornwall, UK
 BGL (artists), a Canadian artist collective
 BGL BNP Paribas, a bank based in Luxembourg
 BGL Group, a financial services company based in  Peterborough, UK 
 Bombe Guidée Laser, a guided bomb developed by Matra in France
 Busan–Gimhae Light Rail Transit, a transit system in South Korea

See also